Patkau Architects is an architecture firm based in Vancouver, British Columbia, Canada.
It is a full-service firm practicing in Canada and the United States. Its project scope includes, but is not limited to, gallery installations, art galleries, libraries, university buildings, urban planning and private residences. The firm has received numerous national and international architectural awards. Patkau Architects also represented Canada at the Venice Biennale in 2006.

Patkau Architects' work has been widely published, including three books dedicated to the firm's work, numerous articles in professional journals and books, and their work has been featured in exhibitions around the world. They have also published their own book entitled Patkau Architects: Material Operations  in 2017 that discusses the firm's beliefs and techniques through materials and unconventional practices.

History

 John and Patricia Patkau 
John and Patricia Patkau were both born in Winnipeg, Manitoba in Canada, John on August 18, 1947 and Patricia on February 25, 1950. They met whilst when they were both getting an undergraduate degree at the University of Manitoba where John graduated with a bachelor's degree in arts and environmental studies in 1969 and Patricia graduated with a bachelor of interior design in 1973. They both went on to receive their Masters of Architecture, John continued at the University of Manitoba in 1973 and Patricia completed hers at Yale University in 1978.

 Patkau Architects 
The firm was founded by spouses John Patkau and Patricia Patkau in Edmonton, Alberta in 1978.  It was relocated to Vancouver in 1984. Michael Cunningham was the third principal from 1995 until he departing from the firm in 2010.  As of 2014 the firm has a total staff of 20, including four principals: John Patkau, Patricia Patkau, Greg Boothroyd and David Shone. Patkau Architects has been one of the pioneers in using wood within the architectural industry and have received seven wood design awards starting in 1984.

Both Patricia Patkau and John Patkau are fellows of the Royal Architecture Institute of Canada, honorary fellows of the American Institute of Architects and of the Royal Institute of British Architects, members of the Royal Canadian Academy of Art, and members of the Order of Canada.Festival of Architecture and Forum to feature 2009 RAIC Gold Medalists, Royal Architectural Institute of Canada, March 29, 2009 .  Retrieved 2014-01-16

Design approach
The firm's work has been noted for drawing on the principles of modern architecture that is also inspired by the natural setting and traditions of Canada's West Coast and the Pacific Northwest. Their designs are known for their sculptural quality, multifaceted expression of material, comfort, and clear delineation of detail.Carefoot, L. (1999). An interview with John Patkau: A West Coast perspective from a British Columbia architect. School Libraries in Canada, 19(1), 13-14. Patkau Architects design in such a way that they attempt to respond to the natural environment that surrounds their building site, not impose on it. They draw inspiration from the natural environment and are currently pushing the limitations of wood in architecture. Their drive to pull as much from nature as possible has led them towards innovation in ways further than just using natural materials like wood; in the Temple of Light specifically, they used "light" as a primary building material. Architectural historian-theorist Kenneth Frampton has described the firm's work as "very close to what I attempted to define in 1983 as Critical Regionalism."

 Notable Projects 

 University of Toronto Academic Wood Tower 
Patkau Architects, alongside MJMA, designed a 15 storey wooden tower for the University of Toronto located in Toronto, Ontario to be used for classrooms and offices. It is designed to be 80 meters tall which will make it North America's tallest structural timber building. The entire structure of the tower is constructed using glu-laminated mass timber, some of which is left exposed to draw attention to the construction method. The design is hoping to create precedent for future mass timber construction as the zoning for height restrictions of tall wood buildings is being challenged in order to complete the project.

 Capilano Library 
The Capilano Library is a 10,000 square foot, all black, linear form with a statement roof that has multiple sharp undulations with a softer, wooden clad underside located in Edmonton, Alberta commissioned as a new branch for the Edmonton library. The library contains a children's area and a community room for meetings and events alongside the main library programming.

 Temple of Light 

The original Temple of Light, located in Vancouver, British Columbia, burnt down in June 2014.  For the redesign, in order to bring nature and the sacred into the temple as much as possible, Patkau Architects created "portals of light" that extend from the oculus at the top throughout the entire height of the space. The form is made up of complex, petal-like shapes and was accomplished by fabricating panels off-site to be assembled together on the building site.

 Audain Art Museum 
The Audain Art Museum is a 56,000 square foot, two storey museum located in Whistler, British Columbia that houses Michael Audain's personal art collection. The museum is located on a flood plain at the base of Whistler Mountain, so the structure is raised one full storey on piers to avoid the flooding and implements a seismic system, steel trusses, prefabricated wood panels and handles cantilevers. A steel structural system was used to handle the large cantilevers.

 Hadaway House 

Hadaway House is a private residence in Whistler, British Columbia. The shape of the house was designed based on the size and height restrictions of the area, as well as the need to shed snow off the roof. Whistler has very strict zoning regulations, so the design was started with the envelope instead of being designed from the inside out under normal circumstances. The construction of the house brings together various systems; it uses a concrete slab system with steel and heavy timber framing. These systems were all used in tandem to create the most efficient system overall to counteract the intense seismic and snow loads.

 List of Projects 

 Residential 

 2019: Trail's End House
 2013: Hadaway House
 2012: Tula House
 2011: Mishrifah Villa
 Unrealized: Cottages at Fallingwater
 2009: Linear House
 Prototype: Prototype Cottage
 2000: Agosta House
 2000: Shaw House
 1998: La Petite Maison du Weekend
 1993: Barnes House
 1987: Porter-Vanderbosch Renovation
 1986: Appleton House
 1984: Patkau House
 1983: Pyrch House

 Educational 

 Current: Academic Wood Tower University of Toronto
 2014: Goldring Centre for High Performance Sport
 2012: Daegu Gosan Public Library
 2012: ARTLab
 2009: Beaty Biodiversity Center & Aquatic Ecosystems Research Laboratory
 2005: Winnipeg Millennium Library
 2005: Centre for Music Art and Design at University of Manitoba
 2005: La Grande Bibliotheque du Quebec
 1996: Nursing and Biomedical Sciences Building at the Texas Medical Center
 1995: Strawberry Vale Elementary School
 1995: Emily Carr College of Art & Design
 1992: Newton Library
 1991: Seabird Island School

 Cultural 

 Current: Thunder Bay Art Gallery
 2018: Capilano Library
 2017: Temple of Light
 2017: Polygon Gallery
 2016: Audain Art Museum
 2012: Fort York National Historic Site Visitors Centre
 2012: Our Lady of the Assumption Parish Church
 2012: Rift
 2012: Cocoons
 2011: Onefold
 Suspended: Marpole-Oakridge Community Center
 2011: Winnipeg Scating Shelters
 2011: Gleneagles Community Center
 1999: Air Canada International Arrivals Lounge
 1992: Newton Library
 1992:' Canadian Clay and Glass Library

Awards
The firm has been the recipient of at least one architectural design award per year in every year but three since 1981. These awards include fifteen Governor General's Awards and Medals in Architecture, eight Architectural Institute of British Columbia's Lieutenant Governor's Awards, thirteen Canadian Architect Awards of Excellence, awards from the American Institute of Architects, Canadian Architect magazine, and various national and international design competitions. Most recently, they were awarded the Canadian Wood Council design innovation award for the Temple of Light in Kootenay Bay, British Columbia, Canada.

Publications 
There are three published books based on their career, including two self-written books. Each publication documents different projects representing different time periods of Patkau Architects’ growth.

Biographical Publications

Patkau Architects: projects, 1978-1990 by Andrew Gruft 
Andrew Gruft published his essay on Patkau Architects in 1990. The essay catalogs an exhibition that the University of British Columbia's Fine Arts Gallery held in late 1990.

Patkau Architects by Brian Carter 
Brian Carter wrote the book Patkau Architects: Selected Projects 1983-1994 which was published in 1994 and highlights their earlier works. This book covers 10 of Patkau Architects's projects that were at the forefront of innovation at the time.

Patkau Architects by Kenneth Frampton 
Kenneth Frampton wrote his book Patkau Architects in 2006. The book reviews seventeen projects of all different categories including cultural and institutional, schools and residential.

Projects Mentioned 

 Canadian Clay and Glass Gallery
 National Library of Quebec in Montreal
 Winnipeg Centennial Library addition
 Gleneagles Community Center
 North by Northwest
 Nursing and Biomedical Sciences Building at the University of Texas Houston Health Science Center
 New College House Student Residence at the University of Pennsylvania
 Seabird Island School
 Strawberry Vale School
 Newton Library
 Shaw House
 Petite Maison du Weekend
 Prototype Cottage
 Agosta House
 Barnes House
 Little House

Self-Written Publications

Patkau Architects: Material Operations 
Patkau Architects wrote their book "Patkau Architects: Material Operations" and published it on the Princeton Architectural Press in New York in 2017. They explain their unique perspective of architecture and how they are attempting to stand out and reach new heights within the profession. It goes into depth about their use of unconventional methods to achieve creativity and their artistic approach.

External links 
 Patkau Architects official website
 Patkau | ArchDaily
 Patkau Architects on Architizer
 Patkau Achitects archives | Dezeen

References

Architecture firms of Canada
Companies based in Vancouver